Mount Richard-Molard, also known as Mount Nimba, is a mountain along the border of Ivory Coast and Guinea in West Africa. The mountain is a part of the Guinea Highlands, which straddles the borders between the two countries and Liberia. The nearest major settlements are the town Yekepa in Liberia and the towns of Bossou and N'Zoo in Guinea.

Toponymy 
The mountain is named after the French geographer Jacques Richard-Molard, who died in an accident at the mountain site in 1951. Before that it was called Mount Nouon.

Geology 
The mountain is rich in iron ore and cobalt. The mix of iron rich quartzite sheets, schists and granite gneiss have characterised the geological pedogenesis.

Conservation 
Mount Richard-Molard lies within the Mount Nimba Strict Nature Reserve, which currently covers 17,540 hectares and straddles the borders of Guinea and Ivory Coast.

World Heritage status 
Mount Nimba Strict Nature Reserve is a site with outstanding universal value and was therefore nominated to the World Heritage List in 1981. It has been listed as World Heritage in Danger since 1992.

This site was added to Guinea's "Tentative List" for consideration for UNESCO World Heritage Site status on 29 March 2001, in the cultural category.

Mount Nimba Strict Nature Reserve has been listed as a World Heritage Site in both Guinea and Ivory Coast, under the criteria for natural heritage.

See also 
 Iron ore in Africa
 Mount Nimba Strict Nature Reserve

References

External links 
 World Heritage Site Data Sheet–Mount Nimba Strict Nature Reserve
 Rollard Ch., Wesolowska W. 2002. Jumping spiders (Arachnida, Araneae, Salticidae) from the Nimba Mountains in Guinea. Zoosystema. Paris, 24 (2):283-307
 

International mountains of Africa
Guinea–Ivory Coast border
Mountains of Ivory Coast
Mountains of Guinea
Nzérékoré Region
Montagnes District
Highest points of countries